Northern Records is an independent record label in California. It was founded in 1999 and is distributed in the United States and Canada by RED Distribution (Sony BMG).

Releases

See also 
 List of record labels
 RED Distribution
 Sony BMG

External links
 

American independent record labels
Record labels established in 1999
Indie rock record labels
1999 establishments in California